"Patek Water" is a song by American rappers Future and Young Thug featuring fellow American rapper Offset of Migos from the former two's  collaborative mixtape Super Slimey (2017).

Background 
Kevin Goddard of HotNewHipHop describes that the collaboration marks the end of Future and Young Thug's feud. The song's title mentions Patek Phillipe, a Swiss luxury watch manufacturer. "Water" is a reference to the word "ice", a slang for diamonds.

Charts

References 

Future (rapper) songs
Young Thug songs
Offset (rapper) songs
Songs written by Future (rapper)
Songs written by Young Thug
Songs written by Offset (rapper)
Songs written by Southside (record producer)
2017 songs
2017 singles